Moritz Heyne (June 8, 1837 in Weißenfels – March 1, 1906 in Göttingen) was a German Germanic linguist (Germanist).

He taught as a professor at the University of Halle (1869-1870), University of Basel (1870-), University of Göttingen (1883-).

He worked with Jakob Grimm to edit his dictionary after 1867.

Literary works 
 Laut- und Flexionslehre der altgermanischen Dialekte, 1862
 Beowulf: Angelsächsisches Heldengedicht, 1863
 Heliand, 1866
 Deutsches Wörterbuch, 3 vols., 1890-1895
 Ruodlieb, 1897

1837 births
1906 deaths
Germanists
Germanic studies scholars
Linguists of Germanic languages
Heyne Moritz
Academic staff of the University of Göttingen